was a town in Japan in the Abuta (Iburi) District of Iburi Subprefecture, Hokkaido.

As of 2004, the town had an estimated population of 7,811 and a density of 116.84 persons per km2.

On March 27, 2006, Abuta was merged with the village of Tōya (also from Abuta (Iburi) District) to create the new town of Tōyako.

References

External links
 Tōyako official website 

Dissolved municipalities of Hokkaido